This is a list of websites that contain lists of chemicals, or databases of chemical information. There is further detail on the content of these and other resources in a Wikibook of information sources.

References

Databases